Mississippi County is a county located in the Bootheel of the U.S. state of Missouri, with its eastern border formed by the Mississippi River. As of the 2020 census, the population was 12,577. The largest city and county seat is Charleston. The county was officially organized on February 14, 1845, and was named after the Mississippi River.

History
Mississippi County is located in what was formerly known as "Tywappity Bottom," a vast floodplain area bordered by the Scott County Hills on the north, St. James Bayou on the south, the Mississippi River on the east, and Little River on the west.

In 1540, the Spanish explorer Hernando De Soto penetrated to the Arkansas River and perhaps well into present-day southeastern Missouri, which was then populated by various Native American tribes, including the Osage. Under pressure from a constantly advancing white settlement, the Native Americans gradually retreated westward. The area of southeastern Missouri was noted for its level swampy lowlands, subject to the seasonal flooding of the Mississippi River, which had resulted in extremely fertile soil.

By 1820 American pioneers, many migrating from the southern states, had settled most of the present counties of southeastern Missouri. The settlers were primarily farmers who came from Illinois and the states of the Upper South: Virginia, Kentucky, and Tennessee. They were drawn by the fertile and cheap lands found in the area of present-day Charleston, Missouri. Cotton was cultivated through the 19th century, and the planters depended on enslaved African-American workers before the Civil War and freedmen afterward. There were marked adjustments as people adjusted to the free labor market.

The first American settlers reached what became Charleston in 1830. Seven years later, Thankful Randol sold Joseph Moore 22½ acres of land. Moore used it to lay out a plan for the city of Charleston. Its original boundary was 12 blocks square - four north and south, and three east and west. The Original Plat was filed on May 20, 1837. The General Assembly passed an act to incorporate the city of Charleston on March 25, 1872.

During the late 19th and early 20th centuries, violence increased against black Americans as the state disfranchised minority voters and enforce the Jim Crow segregation laws. Four African Americans were lynched in Mississippi county, the second-highest number in the state and tied with Callaway County. Three of these murders took place in the county seat of Charleston. The fourth man was killed in Belmont, Missouri in 1905. Sam Fields and Robert Coleman were lynched in Charleston on July 3, 1910, allegedly for committing murder and robbery. The joint lynching was witnessed by a crowd of about 1,000. Roosevelt Grigsby was lynched in Charleston in December 1924 by a mob of 200, who accused him of attempting to rape a woman.

At the turn of the 20th century, the virgin forests attracted timber barons. Following the clearing of the timber, the state assisted in the construction of levees, forming drainage districts to redevelop the land. As hundreds of miles of levees and dikes were constructed within the Little River Drainage District, thousands of acres of land were drained and "reclaimed" for agricultural use. The reclaimed land, highly fertile due to centuries of flooding from the Mississippi River, was cultivated for cotton, corn, and wheat. Since the late 20th century, soybeans and rice have been important commodity crops and are grown on an industrial scale.

Geography

Adjacent counties
Alexander County, Illinois (north)
Ballard County, Kentucky (northeast across the Mississippi River)
Carlisle County, Kentucky (east across the river)
Hickman County, Kentucky (southeast across the river)
Fulton County, Kentucky (south across the river)
New Madrid County (southwest)
Scott County (northwest)

Mississippi County has borders across the river with four Kentucky counties, but it has no direct highway connection between any of them due to the mile-wide barrier of the river in this area. None of the four Kentucky counties that border Missouri has any direct highway connection with Missouri. Kentucky and Missouri are the only two U.S. states to border each other, even across a major river, without a direct highway connection between them. This reflects the relatively low populations among the river counties on both sides, which are largely rural in character.  In early 2016, Mississippi County was declared as the poorest county in Missouri.

Major highways
 Interstate 57

 U.S. Route 60
 U.S. Route 62

 Route 75
 Route 77
 Route 80
 Route 102
 Route 105

Demographics
The rural county was at its peak of population in 1940. With changes in agriculture and mechanization requiring fewer workers, the number of jobs have declined, as has county population.

As of the census of 2000, there were 13,427 people, 5,383 households, and 3,671 families residing in the county. The population density was 32 people per square mile (13/km2). There were 5,840 housing units at an average density of 14 per square mile (5/km2). The racial makeup of the county was 77.93% White, 20.53% Black or African American, 0.25% Native American, 0.11% Asian, 0.01% Pacific Islander, 0.29% from other races, and 0.89% from two or more races. Approximately 0.96% of the population were Hispanic or Latino of any race.

There were 5,383 households, out of which 31.20% had children under the age of 18 living with them, 47.70% were married couples living together, 17.30% had a female householder with no husband present, and 31.80% were non-families. 28.50% of all households were made up of individuals, and 14.40% had someone living alone who was 65 years of age or older. The average household size was 2.44 and the average family size was 2.98.

In the county, the population was spread out, with 26.30% under the age of 18, 8.80% from 18 to 24, 25.40% from 25 to 44, 23.60% from 45 to 64, and 15.90% who were 65 years of age or older. The median age was 37 years. For every 100 females there were 87.60 males. For every 100 females age 18 and over, there were 82.70 males.

The median income for a household in the county was $28,837, and the median income for a family was $35,554. Males had a median income of $26,110 versus $17,204 for females. The per capita income for the county was $16,847. About 19.00% of families and 23.70% of the population were below the poverty line, including 31.70% of those under age 18 and 21.70% of those age 65 or over.

Religion
According to the Association of Religion Data Archives County Membership Report (2000), Mississippi County is a part of the Bible Belt with evangelical Protestantism being the majority religion. The most predominant denominations among residents in Mississippi County who adhere to a religion are Southern Baptists (53.88%), Methodists (13.70%), and Christian Churches and Churches of Christ (7.55%).

2020 Census

Education
Of adults 25 years of age and older in Mississippi County, 61.1% possesses a high school diploma or higher while 9.6% holds a bachelor's degree or higher as their highest educational attainment.

Public schools
Charleston R-I School District - Charleston
Warren E. Hearnes Elementary School (PK-05)
Charleston Middle School (06-08)
Charleston High School (09-12)
East Prairie R-II School District - East Prairie
East Prairie Elementary School (PK-04)
East Prairie Middle School (05-08)
East Prairie High School (09-12)
Scott County R-IV School District - Benton
Kelly Elementary School (K-05)
Kelly Middle School (06-08)
Thomas W. Kelly High School (09-12)

Private schools
St. Henry's School - Charleston - (01-08) - Roman Catholic

Public libraries
 Mississippi County Library District

Politics

State
Mississippi County is split in half by two different districts of the Missouri House of Representatives. The northern portion of the county is a part of House District 148 and is currently represented by State Representative Holly Rehder(R) of Sikeston.  The southern portion of the county is a part of House District 149 and is represented by State Representative Don Rone(R) of Portageville.

All of Mississippi County is a part of Missouri's 25th District in the Missouri Senate and is currently represented by State Senator Doug Libla(R).

Federal
Mississippi County is included in Missouri's 8th Congressional District and is represented by Jason T. Smith (R-Salem) in the U.S. House of Representatives.

Political culture

At the presidential level, Mississippi County was a solidly Democratic county from its founding in 1845 through 2000, breaking with the Democratic Party only to vote for Constitutional Unionist John Bell in 1860 and Richard Nixon in his 1972 landslide within this period. In 2004, George W. Bush became only the second Republican ever to carry the county, despite his narrow national popular vote win, and in 2008, John McCain carried it again, by a larger margin, despite his convincing national defeat. As of 2020, the county has voted Republican for five straight elections, with an increased vote share every time; the Republican vote share has not gone below 60% since 2008.

Voters in Mississippi County generally adhere to socially and culturally conservative principles but are more moderate or populist on economic issues, typical of what was formerly considered the white conservative Dixiecrat philosophy of southern Democrats, before African Americans regained the power to vote. In 2004, Missourians voted on a constitutional amendment to define marriage as the union between a man and a woman—it overwhelmingly passed in Mississippi County with 86.87 percent of the vote. The initiative passed the state with 71 percent of support from voters; Missouri became the first state to ban same-sex marriage. (This law was overturned as unconstitutional by a US Supreme Court decision.) In 2006, Missourians voted on a constitutional amendment to fund and legalize embryonic stem cell research in the state—it failed in Mississippi County with 57.35 percent voting against the measure. The initiative narrowly passed the state with 51 percent of support from voters; Missouri became one of the first states in the nation to approve embryonic stem cell research.

Despite Mississippi County's longstanding tradition of supporting socially conservative platforms, voters in the county have a penchant for advancing populist causes such as increasing the minimum wage. In 2006, Missourians voted on a proposition (Proposition B) to increase the minimum wage in the state to $6.50 an hour—it passed Mississippi County with 75.66 percent of the vote. The proposition strongly passed every single county in Missouri, with 75.94 percent voting in favor as the minimum wage was increased to $6.50 an hour in the state.

Missouri presidential preference primary (2008)

During the 2008 presidential primary, voters in Mississippi County from both political parties supported candidates who finished in second place in the state at large and nationally. Former U.S. Senator Hillary Clinton (D-New York) received more votes, a total of 1,094, than any candidate from either party in Mississippi County during the 2008 presidential primary.

Communities

Cities and villages

Anniston
Bertrand
Charleston (seat)
East Prairie
Miner (mostly in Scott County)
Pinhook
Wilson City
Wyatt

Unincorporated communities

 Alfalfa Center
 Bird's Point
 Buckeye
 Catalpa
 Deventer
 Dogwood
 Dorena
 Henson
 Pulltight
 Samos
 Texas Bend
 Whiting
 Wolf Island

See also
National Register of Historic Places listings in Mississippi County, Missouri

References

External links

 Digitized 1930 Plat Book of Mississippi County  from University of Missouri Division of Special Collections, Archives, and Rare Books
 

 
Missouri counties on the Mississippi River
Missouri placenames of Native American origin
1845 establishments in Missouri
Populated places established in 1845